Nothin' But the Truth! is an album by saxophonist Teddy Edwards which was recorded in 1966 and released on the Prestige label.

Reception

Allmusic awarded the album 3 stars stating "quite brief (just 32 minutes) but it does give one a pretty definitive look into the style of tenor-saxophonist Teddy Edwards".

Track listing 
All compositions by Teddy Edwards except as indicated
 "Nothin' But the Truth" - 4:07  
 "Games That Lovers Play" (James Last) - 4:08  
 "On the Street Where You Live" (Alan Jay Lerner, Frederick Loewe) - 6:44  
 "Brazilian Skies" - 5:07  
 "But Beautiful" (Johnny Burke, Jimmy Van Heusen) - 7:04  
 "Lovin' It, Lovin' It" - 5:15

Personnel 
Teddy Edwards - tenor saxophone
Walter Davis, Jr. - piano
Phil Orlando - guitar
Paul Chambers - bass
Billy Higgins - drums
Montego Joe - congas, bongos

References 

Teddy Edwards albums
1967 albums
Prestige Records albums
Albums produced by Don Schlitten
Albums recorded at Van Gelder Studio